Stephen Eckersley Boler (23 August 19431998) was an English entrepreneur who founded a business dynasty and in later life became a conservationist in South Africa.

He was born on 23 August 1943 in Middleton, Heysham, Lancashire. Boler started as a 16-year-old trainee at the multinational Unilever.

He made his first fortune in the 1970s, selling cut-price tyre and exhaust systems together with business partner Tom Farmer, who went on to launch the Kwik-Fit chain. One of the trainee managers at the time was later founder of the High Street buy-and-sell business Cash Generator, Brian Lewis, who credits Boler with a major impact on his business life.

Boler went on to found Limelight, a kitchen and bathrooms business, making £40 million when he sold it. Limelight, later known as the HomeForm Group, included household names such as Dolphin Showers, Kitchens Direct, Moben Kitchens and Sharps bedrooms. Homeform went into administration in 2011, and had quotes honoured by brand Wren Kitchens to protect consumer confidence in UK kitchen companies.

In 1983 he bought Mere Golf and Country Club in Cheshire, handing this over to his son Mark in 1994, when he was 22.  Boler had separated from his wife, and his son, whom he sent to the independent school Millfield, recalls him as teaching lessons of working hard. Boler was the largest shareholder of Manchester City football club.

In later life he turned his attention to conservation in South Africa, creating the Tswalu Kalahari Reserve in the Kalahari Desert. He bought dozens of farms covering more than a thousand square kilometres to create the reserve. His will specified that Nicky Oppenheimer, the South African entrepreneur, should have first refusal on Tswalu, and the Oppenheimer family now owns and operates it.

Boler died in Johannesburg of a heart attack in 1998, aged 55, while traveling to his game reserve. Another son, Nick, died in 2004, aged 33. Boler also had two daughters Sarah Jane and Camilla.

References

English businesspeople in retailing
1943 births
1998 deaths
People from Heysham
20th-century English businesspeople